The 2011 Qatari Stars Cup took place from October 2011 to March 2012. It was the 3rd edition of the cup.

It featured 12 teams from the Qatar Stars League divided into two groups, with the winner and runner-up of each group advancing to the semi-finals.

Prizes
The 2011 edition of Qatar Stars Cup was sponsored by Qatar National Bank (QNB).

Winners: QR1,000,000 
Runners-up: QR500,000 
Match winner: QR40,000

Round One

Group A

Group B

Semi-finals

Final

Champions

References

Qatari Stars Cup
Football competitions in Qatar
2011 in Qatari sport
2011–12 domestic association football cups